A botanical garden or botanic garden is a particular kind of formal garden, usually with a scientific or educational purpose.

Botanical Garden may also refer to:

Botanical gardens
National Botanical Garden (disambiguation)
Royal Botanic Gardens (disambiguation)
 Old Botanical Garden, Zurich, dating from 1746
 Botanical Garden of the University of Zurich, opened in 1977
 List of botanical gardens

Books
The Botanic Garden, a book published by Erasmus Darwin, Charles Darwin's grandfather

Transport
Botanic Garden (BMT Franklin Avenue Line), a New York Subway station
Botanic Gardens MRT station, Singapore
Botanic railway station, Belfast, Northern Ireland
Botanical Garden metro station, a metro station in Delhi, India
China National Botanical Garden station, light rail station in Beijing, China
Botanical Garden station (Chengdu Metro), metro station in Chengdu, China
Botanical Garden station (Guangzhou Metro), metro station in Guangzhou, China
Botanical Garden (Metro-North station), a commuter station in the Bronx, New York
Botanic Gardens railway station, a disused station in Glasgow, Scotland
Hull Botanic Gardens railway station, a disused station in Hull, England

See also
 Botanique (disambiguation)